Moreton Say is a civil parish in Shropshire, England.  It contains 21 listed buildings that are recorded in the National Heritage List for England.  Of these, two are at Grade II*, the middle of the three grades, and the others are at Grade II, the lowest grade.  The parish includes villages and smaller settlements, including Bletchley, Longford, and Moreton Say, and is otherwise rural.  Most of the listed buildings are houses and cottages, farmhouses and farm buildings, the earliest of which are timber framed, one with cruck construction.  The other listed buildings include a small country house and associated structures, a church and a tomb in the churchyard, a milepost, and a pump.
 

Key

Buildings

References

Citations

Sources

Lists of buildings and structures in Shropshire